Beowulf: Return to the Shieldlands is a British epic fantasy drama television series broadcast by ITV. It was created by James Dormer, Tim Haines and Katie Newman. Dormer wrote the series based on the poem Beowulf and executive-produced it along with Haines and Newman, while Stephen Smallwood produced the series. The series began airing in the United Kingdom on 3 January 2016 and in the United States from 23 January 2016.

Shortly after the series began, ITV announced that it would not be renewed for a second series.

Plot 
Beowulf returns to his Heorot to find that Hrothgar, his adoptive father, is dead. Hrothgar's wife, Rheda, who had favoured her own son over the young Beowulf, is named his successor. Beowulf's step-brother, Slean, is furious, both because of his return and for not himself being named Thane.

Rheda, now regent, must show strength while scheming for the support of other village heads, in order to gain the title of Jarl (a rank above Thane)—a title some are willing to kill for.

Meanwhile, the reeve is found dead. Beowulf is initially blamed, but manages to prove it is the work of a dreaded skinshifter.

Cast

Main cast 
 Kieran Bew as Beowulf
 Lee Boardman as Hane
 David Bradley as Gorrik
 Lolita Chakrabarti as Lila
 Elliot Cowan as Abrican
 Laura Donnelly as Elvina
 Holly Earl as Kela
 Gísli Örn Garðarsson as Breca
 David Harewood as Scorann
 Edward Hogg as Varr
 William Hurt as Hrothgar
 Ian Puleston-Davies as Lagrathorn
 Edward Speleers as Slean
 Ellora Torchia as Vishka
 Joanne Whalley as Rheda
 David Ajala as Rate
 Sarah MacRae as Saray

Other cast 
 Susan Aderin as (smelter) Kendra
 Ace Bhatti
 Richard Brake as Arak
 Claire-Louise Cordwell
 Grégory Fitoussi as Razzak
 Jefferson Hall as (Wulfing chief) Jogan 
 Jack Hollington as Young Beowulf
 George Kent as Young Slean
 Allison McKenzie as Arla
 Itoya Osagiede as (Kendra's son) Tarn
 Kirsty Oswald
 Alex Price
 Jack Rowan
 Emmett J. Scanlan as (Jogan's brother) Skellan
 Joe Sims
 Jack Smith as Red

Episodes

Production

Casting 
On 12 March 2015, Kieran Bew was cast in the series to play the title role; other cast included William Hurt, Joanne Whalley, Ed Speleers, David Ajala, Ian Puleston-Davies, Ellora Torchia, Gísli Örn Gardarsson, Susan Aderin, Kirsty Oswald, Laura Donnelly, Edward Hogg, Alex Price, Jack Rowan, and Itoya Osagiede. On 17 April 2015, David Harewood was added to the cast. Additional casting was announced on 19 August 2015, including Joe Sims, Lee Boardman, David Bradley, Ace Bhatti, and Grégory Fitoussi.

Filming 
Filming on the series began in April 2015 in Weardale, County Durham. The main outdoor set was built on the site of a former cement works south of Eastgate, which is west of Stanhope. Filming also took place across Northumberland, and a film crew was spotted on the beach at Bamburgh in late April. In June, a set was built in the sand dunes at Druridge Bay, and another on the shoreline of Derwent Reservoir. The main filming studios in the North East were located at the former Dewhirst clothing factory and warehouse, in Blyth, Northumberland.

Kieran Bew said he had started to put down roots in Los Angeles when he was cast in the title role: "It's been incredible to come back home... I got this job and literally ended up working 20 minutes from where I grew up. It's really strange and really lovely to drive to work and see signs like Spennymoor and Darlington."

Reception 

The series has received mixed reviews holding a 5.5 average rating on review aggregator, Rotten Tomatoes. Positive reviews have garnered approval for the plot, creature mythology, and writing, with one television critic praising the series for its set design and special effects. Negative reviews have tended to say the series feels too derivative of works like Game of Thrones and The Lord of the Rings. Esquire stated that the show "seems determined to remain true to source material, which involves a lot of glowering, growling and stomping around. That may have been enough two millenniums ago, but in 21st century America, it's a bit of a buzzkill." Ed Power of The Telegraph said of the show, "Cheap-looking special effects, a bland hero and barely any resemblance to the source material makes this Beowulf a flop."

References

External links
 

2016 British television series debuts
2016 British television series endings
2010s British drama television series
British drama television series
British action television series
ITV television dramas
Television series by ITV Studios
Television series set in the Middle Ages
2010s British television miniseries
ITV miniseries
English-language television shows
Television shows set in Europe
Works based on Beowulf